Charlotte Susa (1 March 1898 – 28 July 1976) was a German actress.

Biography
Susa was born Charlotta Wegmüller near Memel, East Prussia and first appeared on a stage in 1915 at Tilsit. She chose her mother's maiden name "Susa" as her stage name and began a successful career as a singer and actress at different German opera and operetta stages, e.g. at Brandenburg, Essen, Düsseldorf, Hamburg and Cologne and later at the Admiralspalast in Berlin.

Susa gave her debut as a film actress in the German silent movie Der Prinz und die Tänzerin in 1926 and became popular for her roles as a femme fatale. In 1932 she signed a contract with MGM and moved to the United States to start an international career.

Elizabeth Yeaman wrote in her newspaper column on 15 August 1932:

"Lilian Harvey, Henry Garat, Anna Sten, and now Charlotte Susa, comprise a quartet of important foreign talent that soon will be seen in Hollywood pictures. (...) Miss Susa has arrived in New York and soon will reach these shores with an MGM contract. She was born in Lithuania of German parents and has won great fame in Germany. She first went on the stage as a singer, then as a dramatic actress, and three years ago she took up screen work. Who knows, she may be the actress who will take Garbo's place, provided Garbo never returns."

However, Susa did not succeed in Hollywood, returned to Germany soon and canceled the MGM contract in 1934. Her last role in a movie was a minor one in the 1941 comedy Der Gasmann alongside Heinz Rühmann and Anny Ondra. After that she returned to theater stages.

Susa was married to Paul Cablin, Fritz Malkowsky and after 1939 to Andrews Engelmann. She died at Basel in Switzerland at the age of 78.

Filmography

References

External links

 
Charlotte Susa at Virtual History
Charlotte Susa at Cyranos

1898 births
1976 deaths
German stage actresses
German film actresses
German silent film actresses
People from East Prussia
People from Klaipėda
20th-century German actresses